The lumbar enlargement (or lumbosacral enlargement) is a widened area of the spinal cord that gives attachment to the nerves which supply the lower limbs.

It commences about the level of T11 and ends at L2, and reaches its maximum circumference, of about 33 mm. Inferior to the lumbar enlargement is the conus medullaris.

An analogous region for the upper limbs exists at the cervical enlargement.

Additional images

References

External links
 
  - "Vertebral Canal and Spinal Cord: Regions of the Spinal Cord"
  - "Spinal Cord, Fetus, Posterior View"

Spinal cord